Gus Lusk "Tré" Hargett III (born February 7, 1969) is an American Republican Party politician who is serving as the 37th Secretary of State of Tennessee since 2009.

Early life and education
He is the son of Tennessee Adjutant General Gus L. Hargett Jr. and Mrs. Pat Vaughan. He is a Southern Baptist.

Hargett earned a B.B.A. in accounting with honors, as well as an M.B.A. from the University of Memphis.

Career
In the private sector, Hargett worked for Rural/Metro, an emergency services provider. At the time of his appointment as TRA chairman, Hargett was serving as the corporation's Vice President for the Southern Region.

Politics 
Hargett served in the Tennessee House of Representatives from 1996 to 2006 representing District 97 (Bartlett and Memphis). He was twice elected Republican Leader by his colleagues.

In 2007, he was nominated to the position of Tennessee Regulatory Authority (TRA) chairman, which sets the rates and service standards of privately owned telephone, natural gas, electric and water utilities. He was confirmed by the Tennessee General Assembly and served from February 2008 through January 2009. He was succeeded by Dr. Kenneth Hill.

In January 2009, the state legislature's new Republican majority voted to replace longtime Secretary of State Riley Darnell with Hargett. Hargett immediately resigned from his position as TRA chairman and took office as secretary of state on January 15, 2009.

In September 2017, Hargett said he was in favor of keeping the bust of Nathan Bedford Forrest, a Confederate general and the first grand wizard of the Ku Klux Klan, inside the Tennessee State Capitol.

In 2019, Hargett supported legislation which would make it possible to fine voter registration groups that submitted incomplete voter registrations. Critics charged that the legislation was intended to reduce registration of new voters. Hargett rejected that the bill was intended to reduce registration of black voters.

In 2020, during the COVID-19 pandemic in Tennessee, Hargett opposed allowing voters who fear catching or spreading the coronavirus to vote by mail in the 2020 elections. However, a state judge overruled Hargett's position, holding that Tennessee must allow vote by mail for all voters and that the restrictions on vote by mail that Hargett sought to impose were "an unreasonable burden on the fundamental right to vote guaranteed by the Tennessee Constitution."

On June 18, 2022, it was reported that Hargett had been arrested for DUI after leaving the Bonnaroo Music Festival.

Secretary of State electoral history

References

External links
Tennessee Department of State

|-

1969 births
21st-century American politicians
Living people
Republican Party members of the Tennessee House of Representatives
People from Bartlett, Tennessee
Secretaries of State of Tennessee